Lozovik  is a small town in the municipality of Velika Plana, Serbia. According to the 2002 census, the town has a population of 5607 people.

References

Populated places in Podunavlje District